The Ski Tour is a professional Alpine skiing and a Half-pipe Freeskiing league founded in 2007 and sanctioned by the U.S. Ski and Snowboard Association. In addition to the sporting events, The Ski Tour also features an entertainment package — The Base Camp Music Experience — that includes concerts, parties, and other non-athletic events at each of the tour's venues. The Ski Tour is headquartered in Sun Valley, Idaho, and is sponsored by Honda, Red Bull, Crocs, Spyder, and others.

Four events were televised by ABC in 2007. On November 28, 2007, it was announced that the tour would be merged with the 15-year-old King of The Mountain Series.

Tour dates

References

External links 
 Ski Tour website

2007 concert tours
2008 concert tours
Skiing organizations